Taekwondo at the 2019 Military World Games was held in Wuhan, China from 23 to 26 October 2019.

Medal summary

Men

Women

References 
 2019 Military World Games Results – Page 434

Military World Games
Taekwondo
2019
2019